Varedo (Milanese: Varee) is a comune (municipality) in the Province of Monza and Brianza, in the Italian region Lombardy, located about  north of Milan.

Varedo borders the following municipalities: Desio, Bovisio-Masciago, Limbiate, Nova Milanese, Paderno Dugnano.

Immigration 
 - Demographic Stats

Twin towns
Varedo is twinned with:

  Champagnole, France (2000)

References

External links 
 

Cities and towns in Lombardy